Cold-stunning, also known as hypothermic stunning, is a hypothermic reaction experienced by marine reptiles, notably sea turtles, when exposed to cold water for prolonged periods, which causes them to become weak and inactive. Cold-stunned sea turtles may float to the surface and be further exposed to cold temperatures, which can cause them to drown. A water temperature threshold of 8–10 °C has been associated with mass turtle stunning events. After cold-stunning has taken place, there is only a very short period of time when sea turtles can be safely rescued.

One study indicates that ocean warming has led to an increase in cold-stunning events in the northwest Atlantic.

Notable instances 
In 2016, 1,700 turtles were cold-stunned in North Carolina, following "an unusually temperate fall and early winter".

In 2021, nearly 5,000 cold-stunned turtles were rescued in Texas during a winter storm; it has been called the largest cold-stunning event to be documented in the state.

See also 
 Physiology of aquatic reptiles

References 

Animal physiology
Animal welfare
Thermoregulation